Frequency-hopping spread spectrum (FHSS) a method of transmitting radio signals by rapidly switching.

FHSS may also refer to:

Fuhua Secondary School, a secondary school in Jurong West, Singapore
A number of universities have a 
The First Home Super Saving Scheme in Australia (Superannuation in Australia)